Demetris Syllouris (born 27 July 1953) is a Greek-Cypriot politician. He is the former president of the Cypriot parliament and was the leader of the European Party between 2005 and 2016.

Syllouris was born in Nicosia and studied Civil Engineering at the University of East London.

Career

Representative of Nicosia constituency under the banner of Democratic Rally Party (DISY)-Liberals Coalition 1991–2001, under the banner of DISY 2001–2004, independent 2004–2005, under the banner of the European Party 2005-2016 and since March 2016 under the banner of “Solidarity".

On 2 June 2016 he was elected President of the House of Representatives for the Eleventh Term of Office of the House.

In October 2020, having been implicated by the Al Jazeera investigation into the selling of Cypriot citizenship, he resigned from his role in government.

Prior positions

Parliamentary Spokesman of DISY (June 2001-May 2004).
Member of the Committee of Selection.
Chairman of the House Standing Committee on Trade and Industry and of the House Standing Committee on Institutions, Merit and the Commissioner for Administration (Ombudsman).
Deputy Chairman of the House Standing Committee on Foreign Affairs.
Second Vice-chairman of the delegation of the House to the EU-Cyprus Joint Parliamentary Committee (JPC).
Spokesman of the European Party group in the House.
Ex officio Chairman of the Committee of Selection.
Ex officio Chairman of the Ad Hoc House Committee on the Observance of the Rules of Procedure of the House of Representatives.
Ex officio Chairman of the Special House Committee on Declaration and Examination of Financial Interests.
Chairman of the Ad Hoc House Committee on the Review and Update of the Rules of Procedure of the House of Representatives.

Political career

Secretary of the DISY Youth Organisation (NEDISY) and DISY Enlightenment Committees.
Nicosia District Organisational Secretary of DISY and General Secretary of the Party.
Observer to the European Parliament (2003) and member of the Political Group of the European People's Party.
Member of the Cyprus Scientific and Technical Chamber (ETEK).
Founding member and President of the European Party (2005-2016).
Member of “Solidarity”.
Member of the National Council.

Corruption Allegations  
In October 2020 Al Jazeera presented hidden-camera footage of Syllouris recorded in October 2019 (at a time in which he was already President of the parliament) in which he meets with journalists posing as representatives of an actually non-existing Chinese businessman and convicted money-launderer. In the footage Syllouris promises to use his influence so that the businessman receives Cypriot citizenship, even though providing citizenship to convicted criminals contravenes Cypriot law. In response Syllouris claimed that he was actually playing along with the representatives to gather more information and to finally report the case to the authorities, as he did shortly after. In April 2021 'The Cyprus Papers' was BAFTA nominated.

References

1953 births
Living people
People from Nicosia
Greek Cypriot people
Leaders of political parties in Cyprus
Presidents of the House of Representatives (Cyprus)
Alumni of the University of East London
Members of the House of Representatives (Cyprus)
Democratic Rally politicians